Fire Rock Navajo Casino is a Navajo casino located in the town of Church Rock, New Mexico, on historic Route 66. The casino opened on November 19, 2008. The casino is operated by the Navajo Nation Gaming Enterprise (NNGE), which oversees all gaming activity for the Navajo Nation.

The casino has approximately 1,100 slot machines, 1 roulette Table, 7 blackjack Tables. In addition, it offers a restaurant, gift/smoke shop, and a player's club.

References

External links
Official Website
Free Online Slots

Native American casinos
Casinos in New Mexico
Buildings and structures in McKinley County, New Mexico
Tourist attractions in McKinley County, New Mexico
Native American history of New Mexico
Navajo Nation
Casinos completed in 2008